Li Shouxin (born October 1954 in Hejian) is a Chinese politician who has been serving as party secretary of Shandong University since October 2011.

References

People's Republic of China politicians from Hebei
Living people
Politicians from Cangzhou
Chinese Communist Party politicians from Hebei
Year of birth missing (living people)